This is a list of selected dishes found in the Philippines. While the names of some dishes may be the same as those found in other cuisines, many of them have evolved to mean something distinctly different in the context of Filipino cuisine.

Main dishes

Soups and stews

Noodle dishes

Vegetables

Rice

Preserved meat and fish

Pickles and side dishes

Miscellaneous and street food

Bread and pastries

Sweets

Sauces and condiments

Drinks

Ingredients

See also

Kapampangan cuisine
List of Philippine desserts
Philippine condiments

References

External links

Filipino Recipes

Food and Drink
Philippine